Heather Smith may refer to:

Heather Smith (curler) (born 1972), Canadian curler
Heather Smith (public servant), Australian public servant
Heather Forster Smith, Chief Justice of the Ontario Superior Court of Justice
Heather Rene Smith (born 1987), American model